Maria Chapa Lopez is an American attorney who served as the United States Attorney for the Middle District of Florida from 2018 to 2021.

Education

Chapa Lopez received her Bachelor of Arts from the University of Texas, her Juris Doctor from South Texas College of Law, and her Master of Laws from The JAG School at the University of Virginia.

Legal career
From April 2000 to April 2016, Chapa Lopez worked as an Assistant United States Attorney in the U.S. Attorney's Office for the Middle District of Florida, prosecuting complex transnational and domestic drug trafficking organizations, large-scale money laundering cases, and complex opioid cases. From April 2016 to January 2018, she was the DOJ Deputy Attaché in the U.S. Embassy in Mexico City. Prior to joining the U.S. Attorney's Office, she served in the United States Army Judge Advocate General's Corps, achieving the rank of Lieutenant Colonel.

U.S. Attorney

On January 3, 2018, United States Attorney General Jeff Sessions announced the appointment of Chapa Lopez to serve as interim U.S. Attorney after the resignation of A. Lee Bentley III.

On May 10, 2018, President Trump announced his intent to nominate Chapa Lopez to be the United States Attorney for the Middle District of Florida. On May 15, 2018, her nomination was sent to the Senate. On July 12, 2018, her nomination was reported out of committee by a voice vote. On August 28, 2018, her nomination was confirmed in the United States Senate by voice vote. She was sworn into office on September 4, 2018.

On February 8, 2021, she along with 55 other Trump-era attorneys were asked to resign. She resigned on February 27, 2021.

References

External links
Biography at the United States Attorney's Office for the Middle District of Florida

Living people
20th-century American lawyers
21st-century American lawyers
Assistant United States Attorneys
Florida lawyers
South Texas College of Law alumni
United States Attorneys for the Middle District of Florida
University of Texas alumni
Year of birth missing (living people)
The Judge Advocate General's Legal Center and School alumni
20th-century American women lawyers
21st-century American women lawyers